Nemaglossa brevis is a species of beetle in the family Carabidae, the only species in the genus Nemaglossa.

References

Harpalinae